David Stewart, Earl of Moray (c. 1455 – before 18 July 1457) was a son of King James II of Scotland.

He was created Earl of Moray on 12 February 1456, yet he died aged between one and three, before 18 July 1457.

Earls of Moray
Year of birth uncertain
1457 deaths
Scottish princes
Peers created by James II of Scotland
Royalty and nobility who died as children
Sons of kings